The Ministry of Foreign Affairs, Cooperation and African Integration of the Government of Niger (var. Foreign Ministry) is the government authority responsible for the foreign relations of Niger and its diplomatic corps abroad.  The Foreign Ministry is headed by the Minister of Foreign Affairs, a political appointment who sits in the Council of Ministers of Niger, reporting directly to the President of Niger. "African Integration" is a reference to the Minister's role in the African Union and its long desired Pan-African project on continental integration. The current Minister is Ibrahim Yacouba, who has held the post since 2016.

Structure
Overseen by the Minister and his office is the General Secretariat of the Ministry of Foreign Affairs.  Offices below this are the Directorate of Bilateral African Cooperation, which oversees the diplomatic missions of Niger in Africa, the Directorate Europe, for embassies to and relations with European governments, and the Directorate America, Asia and Oceania, for those governments.  Multilateral contacts with the African Union and other African bodies are overseen by the Directorate of African Union and Integration, while the Directorate of United Nations and International Organisations oversees missions to the United Nations (and Niger's Consulate in New York) and other bodies (such as Unesco).

List of ministers
This is a list of Ministers of Foreign Affairs of Niger:

1958–1963: Hamani Diori
1963–1965: Adamou Mayaki
1965–1967: Hamani Diori
1967–1970: Abdou Sidikou
1970............ Barcourgné Courmo
1970–1972: Mamadou Maidah
1972–1974: Boukary Sabo
1974–1979: Moumouni Adamou Djermakoye
1979–1983: Daouda Diallo
1983–1985: Ide Oumarou
1985–1988: Mahamane Sani Bako
1988–1989: Allele Elhadj Habibou
1989–1991: Mahamane Sani Bako
1991–1993: Hassane Hamidou
1993–1995: Abdourahmane Hama
1995–1996: Mohamed Bazoum
1996............ André Salifou
1996–1997: Ibrahim Hassane Mayaki
1997–1999: Maman Sambo Sidikou
1999–2000: Aïchatou Mindaoudou
2000–2001: Nassirou Sabo
2001–2010: Aïchatou Mindaoudou
2010–2011: Touré Aminatou Maiga
2011–2015: Mohamed Bazoum
2015–2016: Aïchatou Boulama Kané
2016–2018: Ibrahim Yacouba
2018–2021: Kalla Ankourao
2021–present: Hassoumi Massaoudou

See also
Government of Niger

References

Niger
Foreign relations of Niger
Foreign Affairs, Cooperation And African Integration
Niger, Foreign Affairs, Cooperation And African Integration